The Rainbow-class submarine or R class was a quartet of patrol submarines built for the Royal Navy in the early 1930s.

Design and description 
The Rainbow-class submarines were designed as improved versions of the Parthian class and were intended for long-range operations in the Far East. They displaced  on the surface and  submerged. The Rainbow-class submarines had a crew of 56 officers and ratings.

For surface running, the boats were powered by two  diesel engines, each driving one propeller shaft. When submerged each propeller was driven by a  electric motor. They could reach  on the surface and  underwater.

The boats were armed with six 21-inch torpedo tubes in the bow and two more in the stern. They carried six reload torpedoes for a grand total of fourteen torpedoes. They were also armed with a QF 4.7-inch (120 mm) Mark IX deck gun.

Boats
Six boats were planned, but economic considerations resulted in the cancellation of the projected boats HMS Royalist and HMS Rupert.

It is often stated that the  sank HMS Rainbow.

Notes

References

External links

Rainbow class at Uboat.net
Rainbow class at battleships-cruisers.co.uk

Submarine classes